Peerless Lake is a lake in northern Alberta, Canada.

See also
List of lakes in Alberta

References

Peerless Lake
Municipal District of Opportunity No. 17